Linita (foaled March 25, 1957) was an American Thoroughbred racing mare in California.

Background
Linita was a chestnut mare bred and raced by Angelo and Herman Corradini in partnership with George Dorney, she was trained by Clyde Turk throughout her career.

Racing career
Linita won seventeen career races of which the majority were important stakes races including two editions of the Sequoia Handicap in 1961  and again in 1963.

Breeding record
As a broodmare, Linita's foals met with little success in racing.

Pedigree

References

 Linita's pedigree and partial racing stats

1957 racehorse births
Thoroughbred family 4-m
Racehorses bred in California
Racehorses trained in the United States